Jeffrey Michael D'Amico (born November 9, 1974) is a former Major League Baseball pitcher for the Kansas City Royals. He pitched just seven games for them during the  season, including a single start against the Oakland Athletics on June 18, which the Royals lost 21–3.

Sources

Baseball players from California
Major League Baseball pitchers
Kansas City Royals players
Buffalo Bisons (minor league) players
1974 births
Living people
Baseball players from Inglewood, California
Arizona League Athletics players
Edmonton Trappers players
American expatriate baseball players in Canada
Huntsville Stars players
Louisville Bats players
Midland RockHounds players
Modesto A's players
Omaha Golden Spikes players
Scranton/Wilkes-Barre Red Barons players
Southern Oregon A's players
Vancouver Canadians players
West Michigan Whitecaps players